Stanley Burke, Jr. (February 8, 1923 – May 28, 2016) was a Canadian television journalist.

Early years
Burke's father was businessman Stanley Burke, founder of Pemberton Securities, a stockbrokerage firm in Western Canada. His brother was Lieutenant-Commander Cornelius Burke, a prominent Royal Canadian Navy officer during World War II.

Career
He was the anchor of CBC Television's The National News from 1966 to 1969. The show was renamed The National after he resigned to launch a public campaign to bring attention to the Nigerian Civil War and the humanitarian crisis in the secessionist state of Biafra.

Following his retirement from the CBC, Burke also wrote a number of books satirizing Canadian politics in the form of children's stories, including Frog Fables and Beaver Tales, The Day of the Glorious Revolution and Swamp Song.

In the 1980s he was publisher with partner Jack McCann of the weekly newspaper Nanaimo Times in Nanaimo, British Columbia.

Death
Stanley Burke, Jr. died at the Kingston General Hospital in Kingston, Ontario on May 28, 2016, aged 93.

Bibliography

References

External links
 Stanley Burke

1923 births
2016 deaths
Canadian television news anchors
Canadian humorists
CBC Television people
20th-century Canadian journalists